Team Trees, stylized as #TEAMTREES, is a collaborative fundraiser that raised 20 million U.S. dollars before the start of 2020 to plant 20 million trees. The initiative was started by American YouTubers  MrBeast and Mark Rober, and was mostly supported by YouTubers. All donations go to the Arbor Day Foundation, a tree planting organization that pledges to plant one tree for every U.S. dollar donated. The Arbor Day Foundation began planting in January 2020 and plans to end "no later than December 2022". It is estimated that 23 million trees would take up  of land, absorb around 1.6 million tons of carbon and remove 116 thousand tons of pollutants from the atmosphere.

, the project has raised $24,335,381, exceeding the fundraiser's goal to plant 20 million trees. As anticipated, more than 20 million trees have been planted.

Background

The idea started on May 24, 2019, when a fan suggested on Reddit that MrBeast (Jimmy Donaldson) should plant 20 million trees to celebrate reaching 20 million subscribers on YouTube. The idea spread across YouTube, Reddit, and Twitter, mostly in the form of memes. The idea may have been related to the 2019 Amazon rainforest wildfires. American YouTuber, engineer, and inventor Mark Rober partnered directly with Donaldson to launch the fundraiser. On October 25, 2019, Donaldson uploaded a YouTube video explaining his plan, which claimed the top spot on YouTube's trending page, and caused numerous YouTubers to join the movement.

Notable YouTubers who have donated include PewDiePie, Rhett & Link, Marshmello, iJustine, Marques Brownlee, The Slow Mo Guys, Ninja, Simone Giertz, Jacksepticeye, Smarter Every Day, Mark Rober, Simply Nailogical, The King of Random, Dude Perfect, The Try Guys, Alan Becker, Alan Walker, TheOdd1sOut Linus Tech Tips, Jeffree Star,  MinuteEarth, and Jaiden Animations. Entrepreneurs such as Elon Musk, Tobias Lütke, Marc Benioff, Susan Wojcicki, Jack Dorsey, and Jean-Michel Lemieux have also donated and promoted the campaign.

The trees will be planted "in a variety of forests on public and private lands in areas of great need" starting in January 2020. The goal is to have them planted "no later than December 2022".

Responses
Many YouTubers created content to capitalize on the growing trend of Team Trees; despite the Arbor Day Foundation reaching out to only a few hundred creators, Team Trees is now featured in over 80,000 videos from over 4200 global creators. Across Instagram and Twitter over 556,001 posts have garnered more than 4.6 billion views. Creators were able to uniquely inspire their audience to become donors and supporters of Team Trees through their relationships with their fans.

In addition to social media influencers, large corporations made large donations including Verizon, EA, Salesforce (Marc Benioff), Shopify (CEO Tobias Lütke and CTO Jean-Michel Lemieux) and Tesla (Elon Musk).

Discovery Channel made a documentary called #TeamTrees about the campaign which aired on December 3, 2019, coupled with a donation of USD $100,203 the next day.

Planting projects 
Planting locations of Team Trees include:

Criticism
Eike Lüdeling, the department head of horticultural sciences at the University of Bonn, stated, "It turns out that many of these seedlings, if you don't do this well or if people do it who don’t really care about those trees, then they all just die quickly. Sometimes it’s probably a better idea to plant fewer trees and really take care of them." Danny Cohn, the director of public relations for the Arbor Day Foundation, addressed these concerns in saying that "the partners who work with the organization are all required to have plans to help their trees thrive."

Legacy

On October 29, 2021, MrBeast and Mark Rober teamed up again to launch Team Seas, a successor to the project that aimed to help clean up marine debris. As with the Team Trees campaign, many influencers had also joined in spreading the message to help the project be a success. While the project is international, MrBeast and Mark Rober had traveled to the Dominican Republic to help clean up there and address issues with trash collection in underdeveloped and underserved areas.

See also
 Team Seas
 Billion Tree Tsunami

References

External links
 

2019 in Internet culture
Hashtags
Fundraising events
Forestry initiatives
Internet activism
Charity fundraisers